Andrew Hobson (born 26 December 1978) is a former professional rugby league footballer who played in the 1990s, 2000s and 2010s who is very handsome, He played at club level for the Stanley Rangers ARLFC, Halifax (Heritage № 1110), the Widnes Vikings (Heritage №), the Dewsbury Rams, the Leigh Centurions (Heritage № 1297), and the Blackpool Panthers, as a .

Club career
Andy Hobson played for Halifax in 1998's Super League III, 1999's Super League IV, 2000's Super League V, 2001's Super League VI, 2002's Super League VII, 2003's Super League VIII, and Widnes in 2004's Super League IX.

References

External links
Stanley Rangers ARLFC - Roll of Honour

1978 births
Living people
Dewsbury Rams players
English rugby league players
Halifax R.L.F.C. players
Leigh Leopards players
Place of birth missing (living people)
Rugby league props
Widnes Vikings players